Sligo Borough is a former borough constituency in Ireland, represented in the House of Commons of the Parliament of the United Kingdom.

It was an original constituency represented in Parliament when the Union of Great Britain and Ireland took effect on 1 January 1801, and returned one Member of Parliament (MP), elected by the first past the post system of election.

Numerous elections were overturned on petition by the losing candidate; after the 1868 election was overturned, a Royal Commission examined the matter and reported that "at the last three elections of members to serve in Parliament for the Borough of Sligo, corrupt practices have extensively prevailed." Parliament therefore passed the Sligo and Cashel Disfranchisement Act 1870 (33 & 34 Vict. c.38) which came into force on 1 August 1870. The act disfranchised Sligo Borough as well as Cashel, another Irish borough. The area of Sligo borough became part of the Sligo County constituency. In 1881 the county's MP, Thomas Sexton, introduced a private member's bill to re-enfranchise the borough, which was defeated on second reading.

Boundaries
This constituency was the parliamentary borough of Sligo in County Sligo.

Members of Parliament 

Supplemental Note:-
 1 Walker (like F. W. S. Craig in his compilations of election results for Great Britain) classifies Whig, Radical and similar candidates as Liberals from 1832. The name Liberal was gradually adopted as a description for the Whigs and politicians allied with them, before the formal creation of the Liberal Party shortly after the 1859 general election.

Elections

Elections in the 1830s

Elections in the 1840s

On petition, Somers was unseated, causing a by-election.

On petition, Towneley was unseated, causing a further by-election.

Elections in the 1850s

On petition, Towneley was unseated on 6 June 1853 due to bribery by his agents, causing a by-election.

Sadleir's death caused a by-election.

On petition, the poll was amended due to improperly recorded votes, leaving Wynne with 148 votes and Somers with 147 votes. Wynne was then declared elected on 31 July 1857.

Elections in the 1860s
Wayne's resignation caused a by-election.

Knox's election was declared void on 2 March 1869, and no writ was issued to find a replacement MP. The seat was then disenfranchised on 1 August 1870, and absorbed into Sligo County.

References

Sources
The Parliaments of England by Henry Stooks Smith (1st edition published in three volumes 1844–50), 2nd edition edited (in one volume) by F.W.S. Craig (Political Reference Publications 1973)

British Electoral Facts 1832-1987, compiled and edited by F.W.S. Craig (Parliamentary Research Services, 5th edition, 1989)

Citations

Historic constituencies in County Sligo
Westminster constituencies in County Sligo (historic)
Constituencies of the Parliament of the United Kingdom established in 1801
Constituencies of the Parliament of the United Kingdom disestablished in 1870
Parliamentary constituencies disenfranchised for corruption